Matthew "Matt" and John Yuan, also known collectively as The Yuan Twins, (born December 14, 1973) are American twin actors, writers and comic book artists. They wrote the micro-budget zombie film, Death Valley: The Revenge of Bloody Bill for The Asylum in 2004 for producer David Michael Latt.

Biography
They made their acting debut in 2009, in Jody Hill's Observe and Report as Ronny Barnhardt's (Seth Rogen) security guard underlings. Both are fans of Dungeons and Dragons and have filmed a series of zombie survival videos for MTV Iggy. They are also currently the unofficial spokesmen for BOOM! Studios and have guest blogged for Wired magazine's Underwire website.

In September 2012, the Yuan Brothers began writing, drawing, and publishing comic books, starting with a self-published titled Declan and Chang: Sweet F.A. According to the commentary in issue number two and an interview for the website Fanboycomics.net, the characters and story are based upon a MechWarrior RPG campaign that they have, as of 2013, been running with their friends for the past fifteen years.  As of 2015, they have created the comic book series Serving Supes, Inspector Oh, and Love Town for First Comics.

On February 27, 2022, they were named Deputy Publishers for 1First Comics.

Filmography

References

External links

Yuan Twins' Official DeviantArt Page
Yuan Twins' official Instagram page

1973 births
American male television actors
Living people
American twins
American male film actors
21st-century American male actors
Identical twin male actors